Kipchumba is a patronymic of Kenyan / Kalenjin people origin meaning "son of Chumba", or born in the hospital (in the presence of White people). It may refer to:

Benson Kipchumba Barus (born 1980), Kenyan road runner and winner of the 2011 Prague Marathon
Benson Kipchumba Cherono (born 1984), Kenyan marathon runner and 2005 Beijing Marathon winner
Boaz Kipchumba Kaino, Kenyan politician and Member of the National Assembly for the Orange Democratic Movement
Irene Kwambai Kipchumba (born 1978), Kenyan long-distance runner
Jafred Chirchir Kipchumba (born 1983), Kenyan marathon runner and 2011 Eindhoven Marathon winner
Paul Kipchumba (born 1983), foremost young Kenyan writer of Kalenjin descent
Paul Kipchumba Lonyangata (born 1992), Kenyan marathon runner
Peter Kipchumba Rono (born 1967), Kenyan middle-distance runner and 1988 Olympic champion
Robert Kipkorir Kipchumba (born 1984), Kenyan road runner and 2006 World Half Marathon runner-up
Ronald Kipchumba Rutto (born 1987), Kenyan steeplechase and marathon runner
Titus Kipchumba Mbishei (born 1990), Kenyan long-distance runner
Vincent Kipchumba, Kenyan long-distance runner
Wilson Kipchumba Kirwa (born 1974), Kenyan middle-distance runner competing for Finland

References

Kalenjin names